Delfini (trans. The Dolphins) were a Yugoslav rock band formed in Zagreb in 1963. They are notable as one of the pioneers of the Yugoslav rock scene.

History

1963–1967
Delfini were formed in Zagreb in April of 1963 by Zdenko Juran (vocals), Rajmond Ruić (bass guitar), Mladen Šurina (guitar), Branimir Baković (rhythm guitar), Velimir Neidhard (drums) and Vladimir Stošić (keyboards). The band had their debut performance on December 26 of the same year in Gavella Drama Theatre, performing alongside Roboti and Mladi, and soon started to perform regularly on dances.

In July 1964 on the competition of bands held in Zagreb's Šalata Delfini won the second place, Crveni Koralji winning the first. After this success, the band recorded several songs for Radio Zagreb, the song "Šejk" ("Shake") becoming a minor hit. The band was praised in the press, especially for Juran's on-stage performances inspired by the ones of Cliff Richard. The band performed mostly at the Zagreb Faculty of Graphic Arts, but they also performed at other venues in Zagreb. In 1965 the band appeared in TV Zagreb show Nešto novo – Nešto staro (Something New – Something Old). In November 1965 Delfini played on the Zagreb Beat Music Festival, performing alongside Mladi, Ptice, Uragani, Zlatni Akordi, Stalaktiti, Crveni Koralji, Šigele and the Italian band The Five Fans. During the same year they recorded nine songs for Radio Zagreb, with the songs "Sumrak" ("Twilight") and "Noćas kad si otišla" ("This Evening after You Left"), both composed by Ruić and Baković, having most success with the listneres. With some of the recordings Delfini partially turned towards rhythm and blues. In 1966 the band appeared on the Zagreb Music Festival, becoming the third rock band (after Bijele Strijele and Crveni Koralji) to appear on this festival of popular music. On the festival they played as the backing band for the singer Zvonko Špišić, and the song "Lukrecija" ("Lucretia") they performed appeared on the festival official EP. In October 1966, the band performed on the festival entitled The First Championship of the Vocal-Instrumental Ensembles of Yugoslavia. The competition was held in Students' Center in Zagreb on October 23 and 30. Delfini won the second place, the band Kameleoni winning the first place.

In the autumn of 1966 Šurina and Stošić were replaced by guitarist Nikola Sarapa (formerly of Zlatni Akordi) and keyboardist Petko Katrandžijev (formerly of Bezimeni). The new lineup of the band recorded their debut record, the EP Gloria, released in 1967 through Jugoton. The title track was a cover of Them song "Gloria". The EP also featured the ballad "Noćas kad si otišla", a cover of James Brown song "I'll Go Crazy" and a cover of Macedonian traditional song "Kaleš bre Anđo". The latter song featured traditional instrument def, played by Pero Gotovac. After the EP release the band had successful appearances on Zagreb and Opatija music festivals. Their second EP, released during the same year, featured the song "Ne pitaj me ništa" ("Ask Me Nothing"), performed on the Zagreb Music Festival, as the title track. The song was composed by Ruić and featured lyrics by poetess Maja Perfiljeva. The EP also featured the songs "Najljepši dan" ("The Most Beautiful Day"), written by Ivica Krajač and Nikica Kalogjera, "Bebel", written by Krajač and dedicated to Jean-Paul Belmondo, and "Najljepša kuća na prodaju" ("The Most Beautiful House for Sale"), a cover of The Kinks' "Most Exclusive Residence for Sale". Both EPs were praised by the press. During the same year, under the name The Delfinis, the band released a split 7" single with Crveni Koralji for the Belgian record label Benelux International. The single featured Crevni Koralji's song "Napoli Guitar" and Delfini's cover of "Gloria".

Despite the successes, Baković, Sarapa and Katrandžijev left the band due to disagreements with Juran and Ruić. The last lineup of the band was short-lived, featuring Zdenko Juran (vocals), Rajmond Ruić (bass guitar), Ivica Grčić (guitar), Vlado Kušec (rhythm guitar) and Srećko Antonioli (drums), all three new members formerly playing in the band Lordovi (The Lords). The group disbanded in 1967, as the band members decided to dedicate themselves to other activities.

Post breakup
After Delifini's disbandment, Juran started working as a music manager. Ruić moved to the band Roboti, later started a career of a successful pop composer, and eventually moved to Australia. Neidhart became a professor on the Zagreb Faculty of Architecture. Baković became an art photographer. Katrandžijev worked as a composer, sound engineer and producer. Sarapa played in clubs, and in 1978 formed the band Stop.

In 2005 Delfini songs "Gloria", "Najlepša kuća na prodaju" and "Kaleš bre Anđo" were released on the box set Kad je rock bio mlad - Priče sa istočne strane (1956-1970) (When Rock Was Young - East Side Stories (1956-1970)), released by Croatia Records and featuring songs by the pioneering Yugoslav rock acts.

Discography

EPs
Gloria (1967)
Ne pitaj me ništa (1967)

Singles
"Napoli Guitar" / "Gloria" (with Crveni Koralji, 1967)

References

External links 
Delfini at Discogs

Croatian rock music groups
Yugoslav rock music groups
Yugoslav rhythm and blues musical groups
Beat groups
Musical groups established in 1963
Musical groups disestablished in 1967